Veeru Devgan (25 June 1934 — 27 May 2019) was an Indian action choreographer, actor and film director who worked in Bollywood films. He worked on more than 200 Indian films including Roti Kapada Aur Makaan, Kranti, Mr. Natwarlal, Prem Rog, Phool Aur Kaante, Jigar and Ram Teri Ganga Maili. He is the father of actor Ajay Devgn.

Personal life
Born into the Devgan family in Amritsar, he was married to Veena, and had three children with her, including actor Ajay Devgan.

Devgan, who rarely made public appearances, was last seen at the special screening of his son's film Total Dhamaal in February 2019.

He choreographed fight and action scenes for over 80 different Hindi films including Mr. Natwarlal, Ek Khiladi Bawan Pattey, Phool Aur Kaante, Jigar, Dil Kya Kare etc. He also acted in the 1981 film Kranti in a small role.

Devgan even ventured into direction with 1999 film Hindustan Ki Kasam which starred his son Ajay Devgn, Amitabh Bachchan, Manisha Koirala and Sushmita Sen.

Death
Veeru Devgan died in the morning of 27 May 2019 in Mumbai, aged 84. Veeru Devgan had not been well for a while and old age and poor health made his health condition worse. He was suffering from breathing problems after which he was immediately admitted to the Surya Hospital, Santa Cruz. However, his condition got critical and resulted in cardiac arrest.

Releasing an official statement, the family said, 'With profound grief and sorrow, we regret to inform that Veeru Devgan, father of Ajay Devgan died. Funeral was held at Vile Parle West Crematorium at 6:00 pm on 27 May 2019.'

Filmography

As Action Director 

 Lal Baadshah (1999)
 Ishq (1997)
 Mahaanta (1997)
 Itihaas (1997)
 Sanam (1997)
 PremGranth (1996)
 Jaan (1996)
 Haqeeqat (1995)
 Prem (1995)
 Dilwale (1994)
 Divya Shakti (1993)
 Gurudev (1993)
 King Uncle (1993)
 Jigar (1992)
 Phool Aur Kaante (1991)
 Dancer (1991)
 Henna Ke Saat Humbistri (1991)
 Kurbaan (1991)
 Benaam Badsha (1991)
 Paap Ki Aandhi (1991)
 Qurbani Rang Layegi (1991)
 Gair (1990)
 Amiri Garibi (1990)
 Veeru Dada (1990)
 Baap Numbri Beta Dus Numbri (1990)
 Shehzaade (1989)
 Sikka (1989)
 Bhutacha Bhau (1989) a Marathi film.
 Tridev (1989)
 Prem Pratigyaa (1989)
 Ilaaka (1989)
 Paap Ko Jalaa Kar Raakh Kar Doonga (1988)
 Tamacha (1988)
 Shahenshah (1988)
 Khatron Ke Khiladi (1988)
 Khoon Bhari Maang (1988)
 Sone Pe Suhaaga (1988)
 Jaan Hatheli Pe (1987)
 Mr India (1987)
 Aakhree Raasta (1986)
 Jeeva (1986)
 Ram Teri Ganga Maili (1985)
 Pataal Bhairavi (1985)
 Patthar Dil (1985)
 Inquilaab (1984)
 Boxer (1984)
 Bade Dil Wala (1983)
 Jeet Hamaari (1983)
 Himmatwala (1983)
 Pukar (1983)
 Prem Rog (1982)
 Johnny I Love You (1982)
 Justice Chaudhury (1982)
 Meri Aawaz Suno (1981)
 Biwi-O-Biwi: The Fun-Film (1981)
 Kranti (1981)
 Hum Paanch (1980)
 Dostana (1980)
 Do Aur Do Paanch (1980)
 Mr. Natwarlal (1979)
 Satyam Shivam Sundaram: Love Sublime (1978)
 Khoon Pasina (1977)
 Inkaar (1977)
 Dus Numbri (1976)
 Khel Khel Mein (1975)
 Roti Kapda Aur Makaan (1974)
 Hum Se Barh Kar Kaun
 Hoshiyar
 Mawaali
 Qaidi
 Ghar Ek Mandir
 Swarag Se Sunder Sattay Pe Satta Khilaaf Ghazab Loha Jaani Dost'
 Qayamat
 Prem Pritigya
 Charnon Ki Saugandh
 Pyar Ka Mandir
 Pyar Ka Devta
 Divya Shakti
 Phool Aur Kantay
 Meri Aawaaz Suno
 Mulzim
 Aag Aur Shola
 Maqsad
 Maha Shakti Maan
 Pataal Bhairavi
 Singhasan
 Farz Aur Kanoon
 Andha Kanoon
 Dharam Aur Kanoon
 Shiva Ka Insaaf
 Be Panha
 Nishaan
 Aaj Ka Daur
 Mard Ki Zabaan
 Dosti Dushmani
 Bhagwaan Dada
 Khud Gharz
 Khoon Bhari Maang
 Shahensha
 Sher Dil
 Insaaf ki Pukar
 Tridev
 Vishwatma
 Mahaan
 Pyar Hua Chori Chori
 Main Inteqaam Longa
 Platform
 Baazi
 Kaamyaab
 Kaala Bazaar
 Benaam Badshah
 Krishan Kanhaiya
 Khuddaar
 Izzatdaar
 Jigar
 Justice Chaudhary
 Mera Saathi
 Aasmaan
 Woh Jo Hasina
 Dau Paich
 Ilaaqa Badd Aur Badnaam Muqaddar Aakhri Raasta Ham Se Hai Zamana Andar Bahar Pathar Gharana Desh Premee Jalaa Kar Raakh Dunga Larayee Watan Ke Rakhwalay Balidaan Samraat Ek Hi Raasta Phool Aur Kaantay Diljale Dilwale Jaan Vijay Path Jaan Hatheli Per Himmat Aur Mehnat Nafrat Ki Aandhi Janwar Alag Alag Mar Mitenge Ram Teri Ganga Meli Sitamgar Waqt Ki Aawaaz Aaj Ka Arjun Hindustan Ki Kasam As an Actor 
 Kranti (1981)
 Sourabh (1979)
 Singhasan(1986)
Sar Utha Ke Jio
 (1979) 
 Mr. Natwarlal (1979)

As Producer
 Hindustan Ki Kasam (1999)
 Dil Kya Kare (1999)
 Singhasan (1986)

As Assistant Director
 Vishwatma (1992; co-producer)
 Mera Pati Sirf Mera Hai (1990; action director)

As Director
 Hindustan Ki Kasam (1999)

As Writer
 Jigar'' (1992) (idea)

References

External links
 

Male actors from Punjab, India
Hindi-language film directors
Indian action choreographers
Punjabi people
2019 deaths
20th-century Indian male actors
20th-century Indian film directors
Film directors from Punjab, India
1934 births